Lê Hồng Anh (born November 12, 1949) is a Vietnamese politician who was the Minister of Public Security of Vietnam from 2002 to 2011. He was conferred the rank of General by the President of Vietnam on January 9, 2005.

In 2011, Lê Hồng Anh was a member of the Politburo, Permanent Member of the Party Central Committee's Secretariat of the Communist Party of Vietnam, one the country's five key leaders, along with General Secretary, President, Prime Minister, and Chairman of the National Assembly.

Lê Hồng Anh is also called "Út Anh", and was born in Vĩnh Bình Bắc Commune, Vĩnh Thuận District, Kiên Giang Province in southern Vietnam. Lê Hồng Anh studied law and gained a bachelor of law and a bachelor of politics. Lê Hồng Anh became member of the Communist Party of Vietnam on 2 March 1968.

References 

1949 births
Living people
People from Kiên Giang Province
Government ministers of Vietnam
Members of the 9th Politburo of the Communist Party of Vietnam
Members of the 10th Politburo of the Communist Party of Vietnam
Members of the 11th Politburo of the Communist Party of Vietnam
Members of the 9th Secretariat of the Communist Party of Vietnam
Members of the 11th Secretariat of the Communist Party of Vietnam
Members of the 8th Central Committee of the Communist Party of Vietnam
Members of the 9th Central Committee of the Communist Party of Vietnam
Members of the 10th Central Committee of the Communist Party of Vietnam
Members of the 11th Central Committee of the Communist Party of Vietnam